Ellis Lankster (born June 3, 1986) is an American football cornerback for the West Virginia Roughriders of the American Arena League (AAL). He was drafted by the Buffalo Bills in the seventh round of the 2009 NFL Draft. He played college football at West Virginia. He has also been a member of the Hamilton Tiger-Cats and New York Jets.

College career
Lankster played his freshman and sophomore years at Jones County Junior College. He finished his collegiate career at West Virginia University. He also played in the 2009 Senior Bowl.

Professional career

Buffalo Bills
On August 15, 2009, in a preseason game against the Chicago Bears, Lankster intercepted Bears' backup quarterback Brett Basanez twice within a span of 64 seconds. Both turnovers led to touchdowns for Buffalo, ultimately helping them win the game 27-20.

Lankster got some playing time in the 2009 season as a cornerback in nickel defense situations, due to injuries to other defensive backs.  Head coach Perry Fewell said of Lankster, "we think he's gotten better every week for us."  He finished the 2009 season with five tackles.

Buffalo released Lankster on the deadline for final roster adjustments in the 2010 preseason, September 4.

Hamilton Tiger-Cats
Lankster was signed by the Hamilton Tiger-Cats of the Canadian Football League on October 11, 2010. He did not play for Hamilton during his time with the club, rather he learned the intricacies of Canadian football.

New York Jets
Lankster signed a future contract with the New York Jets on January 5, 2011. He was waived on September 2. He was re-signed to the active roster on October 11. His playing time greatly increased in 2012, including significant assignments covering fast receivers, following an injury to Isaiah Trufant. He was released on September 1, 2014. He was re-signed on September 12. He was released on September 23, 2014.

Second Stint with the Buffalo Bills
Lankster signed with the Buffalo Bills on August 17, 2015.  The signing marked his return to the team that drafted him. He joined his previous head coach Rex Ryan. He was released by the team on August 31.

Hamilton Tiger-Cats (II)
On April 15, 2016, Lankster once again signed with the Hamilton Tiger-Cats of the Canadian Football League.

Atlanta Havoc
Lankster signed with the Atlanta Havoc in December 2017.

References

External links
 New York Jets bio
 West Virginia bio

1986 births
Living people
Sportspeople from Mobile, Alabama
Players of American football from Alabama
American football cornerbacks
Jones County Bobcats football players
West Virginia Mountaineers football players
Buffalo Bills players
Hamilton Tiger-Cats players
New York Jets players
American Arena League players